Robert Brown Clark (born 26 September 1945) is a Scottish football player and coach. Clark, who played as a goalkeeper, spent most of his playing career with Aberdeen. He also played for Queen's Park, Washington Whips, San Antonio Thunder and Clyde. Clark played 17 times for Scotland and represented the Scottish League. He later became a coach, mainly working in New Zealand and the United States.

Playing career 
Clark started his senior career in Scotland's second tier with Queen's Park F.C. then in 1965 signed for top division Aberdeen F.C., with whom he won the 1970 Scottish Cup, the 1976 League Cup and the 1980 Premier League Championship. During his time with the Dons, Clark played some games as a defender, including against Rangers at Ibrox Park, after losing his place in goal to Ernie McGarr. With 594 competitive appearances for Aberdeen between 1965 and 1980, he is ranked third in the club's all-time list.

Clark graduated from Jordanhill College in Glasgow, Scotland in 1967 with a degree in Physical Education. He was named first team all-star goalkeeper in the 1967 United Soccer Association playing for the Washington Whips and making the USA All Star Team. He also spent the summer of 1976, on loan, in the NASL, playing for the San Antonio Thunder.

A fan of Scottish First Division side Clyde, Clark came out of retirement in 1983 to help Clyde when they had a goalkeeping injury crisis. His father, Tom, was once the chairman of Clyde. In autumn 1984 he once more came out of retirement to keep goal for Forres Mechanics in a 1–0 victory over Buckie Thistle in the Highland League Cup Final held at Elgin.

Clark set the British top-flight record for not conceding a goal in consecutive, all-competition matches (at 1,155 minutes) in the 1970–71 season, until Edwin van der Sar set a new mark on 8 February 2009. He also briefly held the world record, until Bulgarian goalkeeper Stoyan Yordanov set a new record of 1202 minutes in May 1971. Fraser Forster broke the Scottish league record in 2014 and was congratulated by Clark after the match in which it was surpassed. He still holds the Aberdeen club record, although this was threatened by the form of Scott Brown in early 2015.

He earned 17 caps for the Scotland national football team, and was Scotland's backup goalkeeper at the 1978 FIFA World Cup.

Management career 
Clark coached Highlanders F.C., Bulawayo (1983–84), Dartmouth College (1985–93), the New Zealand national football team (1994–96), Stanford University (1996–2000) and the University of Notre Dame men's soccer team (2001–2017), winning the national title in 2013 with the Irish.

In November 2018, Clark was one of four inductees into the Aberdeen Hall of Fame.

Career statistics

Club

International

Honours

Player 
Aberdeen
Scottish Premier Division: 1979–80
Scottish Cup: 1969–70
Runners-up: 1966–67, 1977-78
Scottish League Cup: 1976–77
Runners-up 1978–79, 1979–80
Drybrough Cup: 1971–72, 1980–81

Washington Whips
USA Championship: Runners-up 1967
USA Eastern Division: 1967

Forres Mechanics
Highland League Cup: 1984–85

Scotland
British Home Championship: 1971–72 (shared)

Individual
Aberdeen Player of the Year: 1966–67
Press and Journal Sports Personality of the Year: 1977–78
Aberdeen FC Hall of Fame: Inducted, 2018

Manager 
New Zealand U23
OFC U-23 Championship: Runners-up 1996

Dartmouth Big Green
Ivy League Tournament: 1988, 1990, 1992

Stanford Cardinal
NCAA Tournament Championship: Runners-up 1998
MPSF Mountain Division Championship: 1997

Notre Dame Fighting Irish
NCAA Tournament Championship: 2013
Conference Championship: 2003, 2012
Conference Regular Season Title: 2004, 2007, 2008, 2013, 2014

Individual
USC College Coach of the Year: 2013
MPSF Mountain Division Coach of the Year: 1996, 1997
NSCAA Far West Region Coach of the Year: 1997
NCAA Region I Coach of the Year: Twice with Dartmouth
Jim McCullen Trophy: 1995

Family associations 
His son Jamie has played in Major League Soccer and is currently the head coach of the Washington Huskies men's soccer team. His son Tommy, a paediatrician, is the founder and executive director of the HIV prevention organisation Grassroot Soccer. His daughter, Jennifer Clark, is also a soccer coach and is currently the head women's coach at Claremont-McKenna in California.

See also
 List of footballers in Scotland by number of league appearances (500+)

References

External links

Profile at Notre Dame

 Dark Blue Dons profile at AFC Heritage Trust

1945 births
Living people
1978 FIFA World Cup players
Aberdeen F.C. players
Clyde F.C. players
Association football goalkeepers
Association football defenders
National Professional Soccer League (1967) players
North American Soccer League (1968–1984) players
Dartmouth Big Green men's soccer coaches
Notre Dame Fighting Irish men's soccer coaches
New Zealand national football team managers
Footballers from Glasgow
Queen's Park F.C. players
San Antonio Thunder players
Scotland international footballers
Expatriate soccer players in the United States
Scottish football managers
Scottish footballers
Scottish Football League players
Stanford Cardinal men's soccer coaches
United Soccer Association players
Washington Whips players
Scottish Football League representative players
Forres Mechanics F.C. players
Scotland under-21 international footballers
Scotland under-23 international footballers
Highlanders F.C. managers
Scotland amateur international footballers
Scottish expatriate sportspeople in the United States
Scottish expatriate footballers
Scottish expatriate football managers